Vișina is a commune in Dâmbovița County, Muntenia, Romania with a population of 4,103 people. It is composed of three villages: Broșteni, Izvoru, and Vișina.

The commune is located in the southwestern extremity of the county, in the  subdivision of the Wallachian Plain.

Vișina borders the following communes: Petrești to the north, Șelaru to the south, Uliești and Corbii Mari to the east, and Răscăeți and Morteni to the west. Răscăeți commune split off Vișina after a referendum in 2005.

References

Communes in Dâmbovița County
Localities in Muntenia